Jafarganj Cemetery is located in Murshidabad, West Bengal, India.

Geography

Location

The Namak Haram Deorhi, House of Jagat Seth, Nashipur Rajbari , Kathgola Palace and Tomb of Azimunissa Begum are all located nearby. One can reach the temple town of Rani Bhavani at Baranagar, on the other side of the Bhagirathi, by country boat from Ajimganj.

Note: The map alongside presents some of the notable locations in Murshidabad city. Most of the places marked in the map are linked in the larger full screen map. A few, without pages yet, remain unmarked. The map has a scale. It will help viewers to find out the distances.

History

Jafargaj Cemetery was built by Mir Jafar over an area of 3.51 acres within an enclosure of waved walls, about half a mile north to the Nizamat Fort Campus and inside the campus of Namak Haram Deorhi. It hosts the graves of the later Nawabs of Bengals of the Najafi dynasty, starting from Mir Jafar, and their family members while Khushbagh, which was built by Nawab Alivardi Khan, hosts the graves of the Nawabs of Bengal belonging to the Afshar dynasty and their family members. At present, this graveyard is controlled and maintained by the Archaeological Survey of India.

It is said that earlier there was a "Kitchen Garden" at the site of this cemetery which Shah Khanaum Begum (Mir Jafar's wife and Alivardi Khan's sister) was very fond of.

The Jafarganj Cemetery has the graves of the family members of the Nawab of Bengal. It hosts the graves of Nawab Nazim Humayun Jah, his wives Umdat-un-nisa Begum, Amir-un-nia-Dulhan Begum, Sultana Ghetiara Begum and Rais-un-nisa Begum; Nawab Nazim Walla Jah, his wife Nazib-un-nisa Begum; Mir Jafar and his wives Shah Khanaum Begum, Babbu Begum and Munny Begum; Nawab Nazim Mubarak ud-Daulah, his wife Faiz-un-nisa Begum; Syud Ahmed Nazafi, (Mir Jafar's father); Muhammad Ali Khan (Mir Jafar's brother); Bohu Begum, wife of Nawab Nazim Ali Jah; Nawab nazim Nazam ud-Daulah; Nawab Nazim Saif ud-Daulah; Babar Ali; Mehr Lekha Begum, (also known as Guiti Afroz Mahal), wife of Humayun Jah, who was previously a  mut‘ah wife and Ismail Ali Khan and Ashraf Ali Khan (the sons-in-law of Mir Jafar).

Gallery

See also
 Nawabs of Bengal and Murshidabad

References

External links
 
 

Tourist attractions in Murshidabad
Cemeteries in India